The Ride of Fame is a continuing series of mobile monuments in New York City honoring public figures for being exemplary “New Yorkers” and representing the city in a positive light over the course of their lives. Ride of Fame alumni have also been bestowed with this honor simply for being the top celebrity in their respective fields of expertise. Each public figure honored by the Ride of Fame is presented with a personalized decal permanently applied to the front of a red double-decker bus as a time capsule in New York City. In 2012, inductees were also presented with a permanent seat decal on the top of the double-decker bus in addition to the front decal. The honorees write a special personal message on these seats to share the moment with all the visitors of New York City.

Non-New Yorkers, such as Australian musical duo Air Supply and Colombian singer Carlos Vives, have also been honored.

History

The Ride of Fame's inaugural honoree was Emmy Award winner and bestselling author Rachael Ray in 2010. A ribbon-cutting ceremony took place in front of Ray's studio before she led a group of 50 fans on a tour atop her new bus that was dedicated in her honor. Though New York City was Gray Line Worldwide’s second licensed city around the world, the first being in Washington, D.C. in 1910, Gray Line Worldwide chose New York City as the site to celebrate its 100th anniversary in 2010.

Since Rachael Ray, monthly and bi-monthly ceremonies have taken place to present public figures with a decal for their own double-decker bus. Each public figure has had a ribbon cutting ceremony, most of which took place at Pier 78 on the Hudson River, but some ceremonies have taken place elsewhere, including Times Square and Central Park.

On October 13, 2012 during Air Supply's induction ceremony, the band was the first to be presented with a pair of honorary seats on the top deck of the bus along with a decal on the front. Air Supply also became the first to be inducted as an Immortal honoree; part of the IIi categorization in which each nominee is inducted as either Immortal, IT or imminent.

On April 29, 2014, Ride of Fame expanded outside of New York City.  Jeff Conine of the Miami Marlins was the first recipient of a Ride of Fame honors in Miami. Since then, the Ride of Fame has honored recipients in Washington, D.C., with plans to be around the world, in cities with double-decker bus service.

List of honorees

The Ride of Fame began honoring nominees as either Immortal, IT or imminent with Air Supply on October 13, 2012.
Denotes Honorees inducted in a city other than New York City, which began with Jeff Conine in Miami

References

Monuments and memorials in New York City
2010 establishments in New York City